A. spinosa may refer to:

 Absidia spinosa, a fungus species
 Acanthemblemaria spinosa, a blenny species
 Acanthus spinosa, a flowering plant species
 Acanthopleura spinosa, a chiton species, a primitive marine mollusk
 Adejeania spinosa, a tachinid fly species
 Adenia spinosa, a passionflower species
 Agama spinosa, a small, long-tailed, insect-eating lizard species
 Agathosma spinosa, a small shrub species
 Amorphoscelis spinosa, a praying mantis species
 Almenia spinosa, an arthropod species
 Ancylotrypa spinosa, a wafer trapdoor spider species
 Anotheca spinosa, or Rana De Corona, a frog species
 Aphaenogaster spinosa, a myrmicine ant species
 Arachnura spinosa, an orb-weaving spider species
 Aralia spinosa, a woody plant species
 Argania spinosa, the argan, a tree species
 Atelidea spinosa, a long jawed spider species
 Auximella spinosa, a tangled nest spider species

See also
 Spinosa (disambiguation)